Stefan Kurpas (born 22 February 1955) is a British wrestler. He competed in the men's freestyle 82 kg at the 1984 Summer Olympics. He represented England in the 82kg middleweight division, at the 1982 Commonwealth Games in Brisbane, Queensland, Australia.

References

1955 births
Living people
British male sport wrestlers
Olympic wrestlers of Great Britain
Wrestlers at the 1984 Summer Olympics
Wrestlers at the 1982 Commonwealth Games
Sportspeople from Manchester
Commonwealth Games competitors for England